is a 1991 horizontal-scrolling shooter video game developed and published by Taito for the Super Nintendo Entertainment System. It is part of the Darius series. It was re-released on the Wii Virtual Console in 2010 for Japan on April 13 and for North America on December 13.

Gameplay 

Though similar to the arcade Darius entries, Darius Twin has slightly different gameplay features, most notably in the player's power-ups. Players collect weapon and shield power-ups from square shaped enemies that approach from the front and behind, but once players die after collecting a certain number of power-ups, the power-ups collected stayed with the ship post-destruction. Players 1 and 2 are allowed their own separate number of lives. There are no continues.

The game contains five color-coded classes of power-up. The pink item powers up the main weapon, green powers up the side weapons, blue regenerates and/or improves the force shield, orange gives one extra Silver Hawk, and yellow destroys all enemies on-screen. At two points in the game, the player can find a red power-up with a special purpose. It switches the main weapon shot style between that seen in Darius and Darius II.

Reception 

Darius Twin garnered a mixed reception from critics since its initial launch. In 2018, Complex named Darius Twin 56th on its "The Best Super Nintendo Games of All Time" They called the game the best 2D scrolling shooters on the SNES and noted the gameplay being difficult.

Notes

References

External links 
 Darius Twin at GameFAQs
 Darius Twin at Giant Bomb
 Darius Twin at MobyGames

1991 video games
Darius (series)
Horizontally scrolling shooters
Super Nintendo Entertainment System-only games
Multiplayer and single-player video games
Super Nintendo Entertainment System games
Taito games
Video game sequels
Video games featuring female protagonists
Virtual Console games
Video games developed in Japan